" is the 23rd studio album by Japanese singer-songwriter Miyuki Nakajima, released in October 1996. The album includes a new recording of her 1995 chart-topping hit "Wanderer's Song", and also features her own interpretation of "Lie to Me Eternally", which was originally written for the Long Time No See album recorded by Takuro Yoshida.

Following the massive success of the single "Wanderer's Song", which sold over 1 million units, Paradise Cafe immediately gained an RIAJ a platinum award for shipments of over 400,000 copies. However, the album itself apparently sold beneath expectations, staying briefly on the charts and selling approximately 200,000 units in total.

Track listing
 All songs written and composed by Miyuki Nakajima.
"" [2nd ver.] – 5:02
"" – 4:45
"" – 6:00
 "Leave Me Alone, Please" – 5:10
"" – 4:15
"" – 4:42
"Singles Bar" – 5:54
"" – 3:47
"" – 5:45
"" – 6:39
 "Paradise Cafe " – 5:21

Personnel
Miyuki Nakajima – vocals
Ichizo Seo – keyboards, computer programming
Russ Kunkel – drums
Gregg Bissonette – drums
Atsuo Okubo- drums
Michael Thompson – electric guitar, slide guitar
Dean Parks – electric and acoustic guitar
Tsuyoshi Kon – electric guitar
Nozomi Furukawa – electric guitar
Shuji Nakamura – gut guitar, 12 string acoustic guitar
Neil Stubenhaus – electric bass
Abraham Laboriel – electric bass
Chiharu Mikuzuki – electric bass
Chuck Domanico – upright bass
Keishi Urata – computer programming
Nobuhiko Nakayama – computer programming
Manabu Ogasawara – computer programming
Jon Giltin – acoustic piano, keyboards, hammond organ
Yasuharu Nakanishi – keyboards, synth bass, acoustic piano
Elton Nagata – keyboards
Toshihiko Furumura – alto sax, tenor sax
Julia Waters – background vocals
Maxine Waters – background vocals
Oren Waters – background vocals
Walfredo Reyes Jr – percussion
Nobu Saito – percussion

Additional personnel
Kiyoshi Hiyama – Background Vocals
Yasuhiro Kido- Background Vocals
Motoyoshi Iwasaki – Background Vocals
Keiko Yamada – Background Vocals
Mai Yamane – Background Vocals
Akira Yamane – Background Vocals
David Campbell – Strings Arrangement and Conduct 
Suzie Katayama – String Contractor
Sid Page –  Concertmaster
Ryoichi Fujimori – Cello

Production 
Composer, writer, Producer and Performer: Miyuki Nakajima
Producer and Arranger: Ichizo Seo
Arranger: David Campbell
Recording Engineer and Mixer: David Thoener, Tad Gotoh
Additional Engineer: Wyn Davis, Takanobu Ichikawa, Yuta Uematsu, Chizuru Yamada
Assistant Engineer: Jennifer Monner, Jeff DeMorris, Milton Chan, Hideki Odera, Kensuke Miura, Yukiho Wada
Mixer: Joe Chiccarelli
Assistant Mixer: Chadd Munsey, Hiroshi Tokunaga
Digital Edit: Rieko Shimoji 
A & R: Kohichi Suzuki
Production Supervisor: Michio Suzuki
Assistant for Producer: Tomoo Satoh
Music Coordinater: Ruriko Sakumi Duer, Kohji Kimura, Fumio Miyata, Tomoko Takaya
Photographer: Jin Tamura, Jeffrey Bender
Designer: Hirofumi Arai
Costume Coordination: Takeshi Hazama
Hair & Make-Up: Noriko Izumisawa
Location Coordinator: Chikako DeZonia, Dean Ichiyanagi
Artist Management: Kohji Suzuki, Kohichi Okazaki
Management Desk: Atsuko Hayashi
Artist Promotion: Yoshio Kan
Disc Promotion: Tsukihiko Yoshida, Shoko Sone 
Sales Promotor: Ikuko Ishigame
General Management: Takahiro Uno
DAD: Genichi Kawakami
Mastering: Tom Baker at Future Disc Systems

Charts

Weekly charts

: Limited edition issued on APO-CD

Year-end charts

Certifications

References

Miyuki Nakajima albums
1996 albums
Pony Canyon albums